Institute for Security Policy and Law (SPL), formerly known as the Institute for National Security and Counterterrorism (INSCT), is a multidisciplinary research institute based in the Maxwell School of Citizenship and Public Affairs and Syracuse University College of Law. SPL was established in 2003 by Prof. William C. Banks with the goal of support an interdisciplinary approach to questions of national security and counter-terrorism law and policy.

SPL consists of several full-time fellows and graduate research assistants and dozens of affiliated faculty members at Syracuse University. The Institute publishes analytical policy papers, journal articles, and books; it develops courses and other academic opportunities for graduate certificate of advanced study and curricular programs in national security and counter-terrorism law; and it convenes conferences and seminars at Syracuse University and at its collaborating institutions.

History and mission
The mission of the Institute for Security Policy and Law is to perform interdisciplinary research, teaching, public service, and policy analysis in the fields of national and international security and counter-terrorism. It emphasizes collaborating with national and international practice-based institutes in order to advance common research and project goals. It does this by conducting research, policy analysis, and other projects in consultation with government agencies, municipalities, universities, and other public entities that facilitate public service. SPL offers students from the Maxwell School of Citizenship and Public Affairs and Syracuse University College of Law innovative educational opportunities through certificates of advanced study, curricular programs, and other law and graduate initiatives.

SPL alumni work across the security industry, in organizations such as the Brookings Institution; Combined/Joint Task Force-Afghanistan; DARPA; Deloitte; US Marine Corps; US Military Commissions Prosecutions Unit; US Naval Air Systems Command; the US Department of Defense, State, Justice, and Homeland Security; and elsewhere.

In October 2013, SPL announced it will begin offering Counterterrorism in the 21st Century, an interdisciplinary executive education course, in collaboration with the International Institute for Counter-Terrorism at Interdisciplinary Center Herzliya in Israel.

Leadership and notable faculty
 The Hon. James E. Baker is the current Director of the Institute for Security Policy and Law. He was the former Chief Judge to the United States Court of Appeals for the Armed Forces. He also serves as a Professor of Law at the Syracuse University College of Law, and a Professor of Public Administration at the Maxwell School of Citizenship and Public Affairs.
 William C. Banks is the founding Director of the institute, Syracuse University College of Law Board of Advisors Distinguished Professor of Law, and Professor Emeritus of Public Administration and International Affairs at the Maxwell School of Citizenship and Public Affairs. Banks co-wrote National Security Law, first published in 1990. In addition, Banks and his co-authors published Counterterrorism Law in 2007 in an effort to define the emerging field of counter-terrorism law.
 Robert B. Murrett is the current Deputy Director of SPL and served as the director of the National Geospatial-Intelligence Agency from 2006 to 2010 before coming to Syracuse University.
 Keli Perrin, Managing Director, is an alumna of the joint-degree program at Syracuse University College of Law and Maxwell School of Citizenship and Public Affairs. Her areas of interest include homeland security, cybersecurity, and emergency management.
 David Crane, faculty member, served as founding chief prosecutor of the Special Court for Sierra Leone, an international war crimes tribunal. He was appointed to that position by the Secretary General of the United Nations, Kofi Annan, in 2002. He was briefly cast in an NBC reality TV series called "The Wanted" and is featured in the documentary "War Don Don."
 Isaac Kfir is a visiting professor from the International Institute for Counter-Terrorism at the Interdisciplinary Center Herzliya. He lectures on topics relating to conflict resolution and international security, and also provides commentary with a regional focus on South Asia and the Greater Middle East
 Nicholas Armstrong, senior research fellow, manages the Postconflict Research Database and Analysis Project. The database aggregates postconflict literature to improve access to and management of postconflict scholarship.  He is an Army veteran and a fellow with the Institute for Veterans and Military Families.
 Corri Zoli, director of research and research assistant professor, focuses on issues relating to Islam and humanitarian law, the rule of law, and cybersecurity.

Numerous affiliated faculty and staff from Syracuse University College of Law and Maxwell School of Citizenship and Public Affairs contribute to research projects and academic coursework at SPL.

Publications
The Journal of National Security Law and Policy is a semi-annual, peer-reviewed journal that SPL originally co-published with the University of the Pacific's McGeorge School of Law, before beginning an editorial collaboration with Georgetown Law in 2011.

References

External links
 Institute for Security Policy and Law website

Foreign policy and strategy think tanks in the United States
Counterterrorism in the United States
National security institutions
Syracuse University College of Law
Syracuse University research institutes
2003 establishments in New York (state)
Educational institutions established in 2003